Tolga Zengin (born October 10, 1983) is a Turkish retired football goalkeeper.

His impressive performances at the start of the 2006–07 season for Trabzonspor earned him a call-up to the Turkey national football team for a friendly against Luxembourg in August 2006.

Tolga was on the Turkish squad at UEFA Euro 2008. In response to several players being unable to play due to sanctions or injuries, manager Fatih Terim hinted that he might have been called up as a field player, a testimony to his versatility.

His most successful performance was a UEFA Champions League group stage match against Internazionale in September 2011.

Career statistics

Honours
Trabzonspor
Türkiye Kupası: 2009–10
Süper Kupa: 2010

Beşiktaş
Süper Lig (2): 2015–16, 2016–17

Turkey
 UEFA European Championship bronze medalist: 2008

References

External links
 
 

1983 births
Living people
Turkish footballers
Turkey international footballers
Turkey under-21 international footballers
Turkey youth international footballers
Trabzonspor footballers
Association football goalkeepers
UEFA Euro 2008 players
Süper Lig players
People from Hopa
Turkey B international footballers
Beşiktaş J.K. footballers